KQIP-LP (107.1 FM) is a radio station licensed to Chico, California, United States, the station serves the Chico area.  The station is currently owned by Calvary Chapel of Chico. KQIP 107.1 FM is a low power FM radio station in Chico, California however it also broadcasts online. The radio station airs Bible studies from several Calvary Chapel pastors, as well as a small selection of Christian music. The radio station also airs Pastor Sam Allen from Calvary Chapel Chico on The Calvary Road Radio Broadcast, a weekday radio program.  Listen Live at: http://ccchico.com/KQIP

References

External links
 

Radio stations in Chico, California
Low-power FM radio stations in California
QIP-LP
Calvary Chapel Association